Georges Badin (March 13, 1927 – November 23, 2014) was a French poet and painter.

Georges Badin was the curator of the Musée d'Art Moderne de Céret from 1967 to 1986.

Recent exhibitions
 Maison de la Catalanité, Perpignan (2011)
 Galerie Åkern, Kongsberg, Norway (2007)
 Galerie Lucie Weill & Seligmann, Paris (2005, 2006)
 Galerie Berthet Aittouares, Paris (2005, 2006)
 Galerie Nicolas Deman, Paris (2005)
 Galerie Florence Arnaud, Paris (1993, 1997, 1998)
 Galerie Bernard Jordan, Paris (1984, 1985, 1986)
 Galerie L'Arturiale, Liège (1981, 1982, 1983)

External links
 Archivio Conz
 Artist's Website http://www.georgesbadin.com/

1927 births
20th-century French painters
20th-century French male artists
French male painters
21st-century French painters
21st-century French male artists
20th-century French poets
Modern painters
2014 deaths
People from Céret
French male poets
20th-century French male writers